Karaikudi Sambasiva Iyer Subramanian (born 23 October 1944) is a veena player in the Karaikudi Veena Tradition. He is the grandson of Karaikudi Subbarama Iyer and adoptive son of Karaikudi Sambasiva Iyer.

Karaikudi Subramanian has been designated the title "Top-Grade artist" by All India Radio and has performed numerous radio concerts as well as live concerts at various venues around the world. He has performed with fellow veena player Ranganayaki Rajagopalan and his sister Rajeswari Padmanabhan, both disciples of Karaikudi Sambasiva Iyer. He has also accompanied artists such as flutist T. Viswanathan and vocalist K. V. Narayanaswamy. Furthermore, he has engaged in cross cultural performances with prominent musicians of other genres such as the Irish fiddler Martin Hayes and the Finnish composer Eero Hämeenniemi.

Subramanian later turned his focus to education, exploring ways to make music accessible to everyone regardless of their background. In 1989, he founded the institute 'Brhaddhvani – Research and Training Centre for Musics of the World' in Chennai. A few years later, as a result of his vigorous training with Karaikudi Sambasiva Iyer and his own research at Wesleyan University and later at Brhaddhvani, he developed a pedagogic system of music learning called 'Correlated Objective Music Education and Training' (COMET).

The Karaikudi lineage 
 Through the ritualistic devasam (also called Śrāddha), it is known that before the first recorded members of the Karaikudi family, the lineage goes back two generations further. However, there is only an oral record of the first two generations without any knowledge of names or details. Malayappa belonged to the third generation and Venkateswara to the fourth. Other than their names, not much is known about these two generations either. Subbaraya – the grandfather of the Karaikudi Brothers – belonged to the fifth generation. He was the court musician in Sivaganga and later in Thirugokarnam, Pudukkottai. Subbaraya's son Subbaya was born in Thirugokarnam. Like his father, Subbayya was also patronised by the court of Pudukkottai under rule of Ramachandra Tondaiman. The Kanakabhisekam (gold shower) was bestowed on Subbaraya and Subbayya by the royalty of Pudukottai court to honor their musicianship.

Subbayya married Subbammal and had two children Subbarama Iyer (1883–1938) and Sambasiva Iyer (1888–1957). Subbarama Iyer began learning veena from his father at the age of seven and began playing concerts at the age of 12. He was later joined by his younger brother Sambasiva Iyer. Subbarama Iyer was known for his unique way of holding the veena vertically (urdhva posture) while playing.

With the expansion and increasing control of the British empire during the first half of the 20th century, the royal courts in the small states of India could no longer afford to patronise arts. The political changes affected artists all over India due to the absence of royal patronage. Leaving Thirugokarnam was inevitable for Subbarama Iyer and Sambasiva Iyer who were now left to fend for themselves. After moving to Madurai, where they continued to struggle financially, they moved to Karaikudi. The Nattukkottai Chettiyars (merchant community) in Karaikudi were interested in bringing them to their village and offered the brothers accommodation. Subbarama Iyer and Sambasiva Iyer gradually established themselves with the support and patronage of other interested merchants and soon became known as the famous "Karaikudi Veena Brothers". They were mostly accompanied by Dakshinamurthy Pillai, the legendary mridangam player, who became their closest friend and was often referred to as "the third veena".

Early life and education 

 Karaikudi S. Subramanian was born on 23 October 1944, in Madurai, Tamil Nadu to Narayanan Iyer and Lakshmi Ammal – the daughter of Subbarama Iyer. His exposure to music began from his early childhood from his mother. Lakshmi Ammal was an 8th generation veena player and taught veena throughout her life. In 1957, Subramanian was adopted by Lakshmi Ammal's paternal uncle Karaikudi Sambasiva Iyer – the younger of the Karaikudi brothers. Sambasiva Iyer had no children of his own, and, to pass on the family legacy through a male member of the family, Subramanian became the adopted son of Sambasiva Iyer.

After the adoption, Subramanian moved to Chennai and lived at the original Kalakshetra, Theosophical Society with Sambasiva Iyer, who worked as a principal there. He was undergoing vigorous training in the foundations of Carnatic music for one year until the death of his adoptive father in 1958.

At Kalakshetra, Subramanian had the opportunity to closely observe notable musicians and dancers, such as composer Mysore Vasudevachar, composer and vocalist M. D. Ramanathan and dancer Rukmini Devi Arundale.

Subramanian then returned to Madurai to pursue his academic studies. He completed his B.Sc in Chemistry at Madura College, Madras University and afterwards pursued a M.A in English literature at Madura College, Madras University. In 1975, he moved to the U.S. for doctoral studies in Ethnomusicology at Wesleyan University.

Career 
From 1965 to 1967 Subramanian worked as a demonstrator in Chemistry at Madura College. He then returned to Chennai to work as an English lecturer at Vivekananda College from 1970 to 1975. After completing his M.A. in Ethnomusicology at Wesleyan University, he moved back to Chennai for a short period and worked as an assistant professor of Music at SSSS College of Music, Madurai. Before commencing his doctoral studies at Wesleyan University, he worked at the Singapore Indian Fine Arts Society. After completing his doctoral studies in 1986, he worked at University of Madras from 1986 to 2002, first as reader and later as Professor of Music.

In 1989, Subramanian and Dr. S. Seetha – the former head of the department of Music at University of Madras, founded Brhaddhvani – Research and Training Centre for Musics of the World.

Subramanian has made academic visits to numerous universities around the world. He has had visiting positions at Amherst College (Valentine Professor of Music), Leeds College of Music, York University, University of Michigan, University of Limerick, University College Cork.

In 1975, Subramanian, along with his sister Rajeswari Padmanabhan, were invited by Museum für Völkerkunde Berlin-Dahlem (now Ethnologisches Museum) to document their family tradition going back 9 generations. They recorded the album Musik Für Vīṇā – Südindien. They were accompanied by Tanjore Upendran on the mridangam. The album won the German Record Critics' Award (Preis der deutschen Schallplattenkritik) in 1980.

COMET 
 
Inspired by his training with Sambasiva Iyer and his research at Wesleyan University and Brhaddhvani, Subramanian developed the pedagogy COMET (Correlated Objective Music Education and Training). COMET is a holistic system of learning music  with the purpose of  providing a fuller understanding of music. COMET seeks to preserve the traditional content of Carnatic music, while being contemporary and global in its reach. As an open and inclusive system, COMET seeks to enable anyone to progress regardless of their musical skills and background.
Furthermore, COMET explores cross-cultural musical interactions for a better understanding of one's own tradition through comparison and contrast. Numerous western musicians of various genres have undergone training in COMET. COMET is also applicable for cross-disciplinary interactions, and artists from disciplines such as south Indian classical dance, theatre and poetry have received training in COMET.

Brhaddhvani 
 
Subramanian and Dr. S. Seetha founded the research institute 'Brhaddhvani – Research and Training Centre for Musics of the World' in 1989 with the main purpose of making music and music education accessible to everyone regardless of their background. Brhaddhvani has been considered an alternative to the traditional gurukula way of learning. Subramanian's work is aimed towards bridging the gap between tradition and modernity, global and local, and thus finding meaning for tradition in a modern world.
He has developed novel techniques intended to make the music learning process effective and holistic. To facilitate and accelerate the quality music education, Subramanian's teaching is greatly supported by technology and technological aids, mainly the app Tala Keeper and the online learning platform Patantara.

Dr. Subramanian's contributions in music are multi-dimensional, and his work has been considered pioneering by many. Through Brhaddhvani, he has developed programs that benefit learners ranging from novice to expert. Brhaddhvani offers music training for different levels of knowledge and purposes, and musicians and other artists from various backgrounds, students as well as performing artists, have received training in COMET at Brhaddhvani.

Brhaddhvani has received grants from the Ford Foundation, Impact Partners, India Foundation for Arts & the Government of India.

Learning from the Maestros 

Prominent Carnatic musicians have been associated with Brhaddhvani, among these are Semmangudi Srinivasa Iyer, Sripada Pinakapani, T. M. Thyagarajan, K. V. Narayanaswamy, Lalgudi G. Jayaraman, T. Viswanathan, S. Kalyanaraman, Trichy Sankaran, S. R. Janakiraman, S. Rajam. <ref name="MusicandVisualArt" 

In the early nineties Brhaddhvani brought the Carnatic maestros to teach the students and teachers of the institute. Each one brought an approach to communicating the intricacies of Carnatic music.

In 1993, Brhaddhvani organized a voice culture seminar with musicians such as Semmangudi Srinivasa Iyer, Lalgudi G. Jayaraman, K. V. Narayanaswamy, Sandhyavandanam Srinivasa Rao, T.K. Govinda Rao and S. Kalyanaraman. This was the first time that Carnatic musicians of this stature interacted with one another to discuss voice culture.

In 2003, Brhaddhvani celebrated Lalgudi Year in honour of the violinist Lalgudi G. Jayaraman. Students learned the repertoire of Lalgudi directly from the Lalgudi G. Jayaraman himself. Furthermore, a number of concerts and events were organised by Brhaddhvani to honor the violinist.

Reviving traditions 

Veena and veena crafting

 Throughout his career, Subramanian has worked towards preserving the veena and its crafting.

Brhaddhvani has organised a number of events for the revival and documentation of the veena tradition, including festivals of veena as a solo instrument and festivals of veena as an accompanying instrument as a revival of an older tradition.

Patronisation of veena crafting has become greatly reduced throughout the last half a century, and veena craftsmen suffer on account of lack of patronage. This is intensified by the increasing popularity of the electronic veenas. At Brhaddhvani, veena craftsmen have been patronised since the early 90s. Subramanian has initiated projects to support and preserve the art of veena crafting and veena craftsmen. He has collaborated with the German instrument maker Norbert Beyer to bring about an elaborate illustrative book in German on veena craftsmanship.

Sopanam – Temple music of Kerala

With the support from India Foundation for the Arts, Brhaddhvani in collaboration with Dharani – a school of performing arts in Kochi – documented the temple music of Kerala called Sopanam. The Sopanam tradition is older longer than Carnatic music but the former is now almost extinct. It is only performed in a few temples and as an accompaniment to the Indian classical dance form Kathakali.
The focus of the project was on identification, documentation and notation of the ragas and talas in Sopanam music and hereby make it more accessible to people, in particular musicians and dancers.

Apart from the audio and video documentations of the music, the music was documented through notations. For the notation of the music, Subramanian made use of his own notational system svarasthana notation.

As a result of the project, Sopanam music has become more accessible than it would have been otherwise. The music tradition is now documented on 5 DV tapes, 75 audio tapes, 5 mini discs and 1 VHS tape and over 100 slides and almost 500 photographs.

Music for therapeutic purposes 
 Music as therapy at Brhaddhvani is a natural evolution and has been practiced since the 90s.
The fundamental elements in COMET in building the tonal and rhythmic aspects in the ‘mind and body’ brought an insight into music therapy as a discipline leading to original therapeutic music practices at Brhaddhvani. The three-note practice with Vedic chants is being practiced at Brhaddhvani as mediation to anchor the tones in the body. 
Furthermore, Brhaddhvani has conducted classes in music and yoga as another element in connecting ‘mind and body’.

Subramanian's experiments show that the exercises of COMET have therapeutic benefits. Brhaddhvani has worked with subjects with multiple sclerosis, ASB, dyslexia, spastics, accident victims, stammer, depression, anxiety and other mental and physical impairments. Moreover, pregnant women have received  therapy at Brhaddhvani.

Music for everyone 

Traditional Carnatic music is not available to everyone, which is something Subramanian has attempted to change since 1989. Through his COMET-pedagogy, Subramanian has worked towards making Carnatic music education accessible to schools, seeking to impart music from early childhood, and as an initiative to bring Carnatic music to the less privileged societies, Brhaddhvani has introduced village children to Carnatic music.

Vilvarini

In 2005, Brhaddhvani supported G. Thirupathi in launching music programmes in the village Vilvarini. Long time before then, Subramanian has formed the concept Isai Vazhi Kalvi ("education through music") as part of Brhaddhvani's outreach activities with the purpose of imparting primary education through music to make Carnatic music accessible to all. The programme Isai Vazhi Kalvi made use of audio-visual presentations which proved to be beneficial for the children by visualising what they were taught. Apart from receiving COMET training from the Brhaddhvani team for three months, Thirupathi was also guided by Subramanian on how to bring music to the village children.

The students learned the basic exercises of Carnatic music, basic arithmetic through rhythms, Folk music and aphorisms from Thirukkural and Aathichoodi through which they also learned correct pronunciation and tonal modulations.
The programme resulted in enhanced memory, comprehension and concentration skills of the children. Students with mental disabilities participated in the classes which turned out to improve their communication skills.

Folk to Classical

Study of stylistically divergent genres is a part of COMET education. World musicians specialised in Folk music have visited Brhaddhvani to study relevant aspects of Carnatic music. Through the svarasthana notation, Subramanian has documented Folk songs. Furthermore, Folk songs have been used as kindergartener's music syllabus at Brhaddhvani.

As a result of his interactions with Folk musicians at the University of Madras, Subramanian studied the interconnections between Folk and classical music. In collaboration with the violinist V.V. Subramanian, Subramanian produced a program titled From Folk to Classical in 1990. For the very first time, Folk and classical musicians of India were brought on the same stage to perform together.

Cross-cultural and cross-disciplinary practices 
Brhaddhvani offers music training for different levels of knowledge and purposes, including dance and theatre. Numerous south classical Indian dancers as well as theatre artists have undergone training in COMET. Brhaddhvani has brought together artists from different discipline, including Brazilian and Japanese-American dancers, Koothu-P-Pattarai theatre artistes and Carnatic musicians.

Furthermore, Subramanian has explored the area of cross-cultural musical practices, and world class musicians such as Eero Hämeenniemi (composer), Steve Coleman (Jazz musician), Woody Louis Amstrong Shaw III (Jazz musician) have been associated with Brhaddhvani.

Various foreign musicians have visited Brhaddhvani to undergo training in relevant aspects of COMET. Furthermore, students of Carnatic music at Brhaddhvani have received training from western musicians, including the composer Eero Hämeenniemi.

Subramanian's work at Brhaddhvani has attracted musicians of various genres and received much acclaim for benefitting students and musicians at all levels:

Publications 
 Editor of Rishabham, the second in the series Carnatic Music Theory and Notated Songs, published by Singapore Indian Fine Arts Society, Singapore(1982)
 Gandharam, the third in the series Carnatic Music Theory and Notated Songs, published by Singapore Indian Fine Arts Society, Singapore (1984)
 An Introduction to the Vina, Asian Music, Vol. 16, No. 2, published by: University of Texas Press (1985) 
 South Indian Vina-tradition and Individual Style, doctoral dissertation, in three volumes (712 pages) submitted to Wesleyan University, published by Micro-films University, Ann Arbor, Michigan, USA (1986)
 Text, Tone, and Tune: Interrelationships Among Text, Tune and Tone in Karnatak Music, published in Text, Tune and Tone – Parameters of Music in Multicultural Perspective, a collection of papers presented at the seminar organised by the American Institute of Indian Studies, New Delhi (1986–1987) 
 Birth Centenary of Sangita Kalanidhi Karaikudi Sambasiva Iyer, published by India International Rural Cultural Centre (1988)
 Sino – Indian Musical Symbolism, Report of Seminars, The Bulletin of The Institute of Traditional Cultures of South and South East Asia, Madras, University of Madras,  a comparison between Chi'n and Vina as representative instruments of two cultures, (1989–1990)
 Manodharma Sangeetham of Dr. Sripada Pinakapani translated to Tamil, published by Brhaddhvani (1992)
 Semmangudiyin Kural, published by Brhaddhvani (2008)
 Reminiscences: K Sambasiva Iyer and Mysore Vasudevachar, published by Nirmalam, the Genius of S. Sarada (2008) 
 Continuity and Change in Music Tradition in Contemporary South India – A Case Study of Brhaddhvani, VWB, Verlag für Wissenschaft und Bildung, 2002, Indiana University, Music Archiving in the World: Papers Presented at the Conference on the Occasion of the 100th Anniversary of the Berlin Phonogramm-Archiv (2009)
 COMET, the creative pedagogy, within and beyond Karnatak music, papers presented at the international seminar on "Creating and Teaching Music Patterns" conducted by the Department of Instrumental Music, Rabindra Bharati University, Calcutta (2013)

Brhaddhvani's publications 
 Compositions of Anai-Ayya Brothers, compiled by T. Viswanathan and Trichy Sankaran (1990)
 Raga Lakshanamu of Saha Maharaja edited by Dr. S. Seetha
 Pearls of South Indian Ragas, volume 1–5, CDs by Prof. S. R. Janakiraman

Productions 
 OM – a music program for the Singapore Government Art Festival (1983)
 Nadangi – A 13-episode serial
 Doordarshan telecast (1988)
 From Folk to Classical (1990)

Albums 
 Shambo Mahadeva – Vina Music from South India
 Sunada: Music From the Classical Tradition of South India
 Sree Veene Namaste

References

Further reading 
 Brhaddhvani – Oru Muzhumaiyana Arangu, Dinamani, 2 December 1994
 The Week, 18 August 1996
 Brhaddhvani
 Veena Vidwan Karaikudi S. Subramanian Performs At Smith College, 10 October 2004*
 Thryst with Melody, The Hindu, 22 December 2006
 A Veena Concert in the Karaikudi Tradition, 2015
 Karaikudi Subramanian, Rommen Scene, 19 August 2016
 The basis of Indian music brought via four new textbooks*
 India Foundation for the Arts: Brhaddhvani

1944 births
Living people
Veena players
Musicians from Madurai
All India Radio people
Saraswati veena players
Wesleyan University alumni